was a town located in Shioya District, Tochigi, Japan.

As of 2003, the town had an estimated population of 11,143 and a density of 147.65 persons per km². The total area was 75.47 km².

On March 28, 2005, Kitsuregawa, along with the town of Ujiie (also from Shioya District), was merged to create the city of Sakura.

External links
 Sakura official website 

Dissolved municipalities of Tochigi Prefecture